S6 or S-6 may refer to:

Routes
 S6 (Berlin), a S-Bahn line
 S6 (Milan suburban railway network)
 S6 (Munich), a S-Bahn line in Munich
 S6 (Rhine-Main S-Bahn)
 S6 (Rhine-Ruhr S-Bahn), line
 S6 (St. Gallen S-Bahn)
 S6 (ZVV), a S-Bahn line in the cantons of Zürich and Aargau in Switzerland
 County Route S6 (California)
 Expressway S6 (Poland)
 Essex, a county of England
 S6 postcode, covering areas of north western Sheffield
 a Hanover S-Bahn, line
 a Rhein-Ruhr S-Bahn, line
 a Rhine-Main S-Bahn, line
 a Stuttgart S-Bahn, line
 a Stadtbahn Karlsruhe, line
 Tongmi line

Science
 Ribosomal protein s6
 S6: Keep under ... (inert gas to be specified by the manufacturer), a safety phrase in chemistry
 hexasulfur, a cyclic sulfur allotrope
 the symmetric group of degree six

Technology
 Samsung Galaxy S6, a smartphone produced by Samsung
 Samsung Galaxy Tab S6, an Android tablet
 S6 NBC Respirator, the protective gas mask issued to the British armed forces from 1966 up until the introduction of the current-issue S10 in 1986
 s6 (software), a cross-platform full replacement for init
 S6 truss, a part of the International Space Station

Vehicles
 Audi S6, a car
 ALCO S-6, and American diesel switching (shunting) locomotive
 Prussian S 6, a 1906 steam locomotives class
 Rans S-6 Coyote II, a light aircraft
 Supermarine S.6, and Supermarine S.6B, two 1929 and 1931 racing seaplanes
 USS S-6 (SS-111), a 1919 S-class submarine of the United States Navy
 HMS Cachalot (S06), a 1957 British Porpoise-class submarine

Other uses
 S6 (military), a communications officer within military units
 Star Air (Denmark), IATA airline designator
 S6 (classification), a paralympic swimming classification